{{DISPLAYTITLE:C21H25ClO5}}
The molecular formula C21H25ClO5 (molar mass: 392.87 g/mol, exact mass: 392.1391 u) may refer to:

 Cloprednol
 Chloroprednisone

Molecular formulas